Nordin Jackers (born 5 September 1997) is a Belgian professional footballer who plays as a goalkeeper for OH Leuven.

Club career
On 2 September 2019, he joined Waasland-Beveren on a season-long loan with an option to buy.

Honours

Club
Genk
Belgian First Division: 2018–19

References

External links

1997 births
Living people
Association football goalkeepers
Belgian footballers
Belgium under-21 international footballers
Belgium youth international footballers
K.R.C. Genk players
S.K. Beveren players
Oud-Heverlee Leuven players
Belgian Pro League players
Challenger Pro League players
People from Lanaken
Footballers from Limburg (Belgium)
21st-century Belgian people